The Dhuluiya offensive was launched on 28 December 2014 by Iraqi forces backed by Sunni tribesmen and Shia militiamen on the strategic town of Dhuluiya, which had been held by ISIL for months. On 30 December, the area was recaptured and the ISIL siege on the Sunni al-Juburi tribe was broken.

It was part of a bigger campaign to fully clear the Saladin Governorate.

Background
The town of Dhuluiya (or Dhuluiyah), 50 miles south of Tikrit and 90 kilometres (55 miles) north of Baghdad, is strategically located on roads linking the eastern province of Diyala to Saladin Governorate in the north.

On 14 July 2014, ISIL took control of part of the town. They bombed government buildings, including a court and local council headquarters, and exploded a bridge leading toward the neighboring town of Balad in an effort to prevent the arrival of reinforcements.

The Jubur (or Jabour or Jubouri) tribe, a Sunni tribe in the south of the town, had been resisting ISIL attacks for nearly six months.

In October, Iraqi forces retook most of Dhuluiya, but ISIL later launched a counter-offensive and managed to recapture the ground they had lost.

Offensive
On 26 December, Iraqi forces attacked ISIL positions on several fronts and captured a string of villages south of Dhuluiya. On 28 December, the troops entered from the north backed by the air force, and seized the airport just outside the town.

On 30 December, Iraqi forces completed the recapture of the town of Dhuluiya.

Since 28 December, the anti-ISIL forces have been clearing bombs and other explosives placed by the ISIL fighters in various parts of the town.

The military adviser of the Secretary General of Badr Organization, Abu Hamza al-Amiri was killed by an explosion of a booby-trapped mosque by ISIL terrorists in Dhuluiya.

Retired Brigadier General Abbas Hassan Jabr, who had joined the Badr Organization after the advances of ISIL, was killed on 29 December by a sniper's bullet during fighting ISIS in Dhuluiya. Iraqi Prime Minister Haider al-Abadi issued a statement hailing Jabr as "one of Iraq's heroes" and vowing that his death would increase "our determination to liberate all Iraq".

On 31 December, al-Abadi met with tribal leaders and security forces in al-Dhuluiya district and congratulated them. He said the liberation is "a quantum leap in the war against terrorist gangs and a platform for new victories and does inflict further defeats against ISIS and its collaborators."

References

Conflicts in 2014
Military operations of the Iraqi Civil War in 2014
Military operations of the War in Iraq (2013–2017) involving the Islamic State of Iraq and the Levant
December 2014 events in Asia